Big Frog may refer to:
Big Frog Mountain, a mountain in southeast Tennessee.
Big Frog Wilderness, a protected area in southeast Tennessee.
WFRG-FM, a radio station licensed to Utica, New York.